Elk Township is one of the twelve townships of Vinton County, Ohio, United States.  The 2010 census found 3,306 people in the township, 1,701 of whom lived in the village of McArthur.

Geography
Located in the center of the county, it borders the following townships:
Swan Township: north
Brown Township: northeast corner
Madison Township: east
Vinton Township: southeast corner
Clinton Township: south
Richland Township: west
Jackson Township: northwest

It is one of only two townships in Vinton County without a border on other counties.

The village of McArthur, the county seat and largest village of Vinton County, is located in central Elk Township.

Name and history
Elk Township was founded in 1811.

Statewide, the only other Elk Township is located in Noble County, plus an Elkrun Township in Columbiana County.

Government
The township is governed by a three-member board of trustees, who are elected in November of odd-numbered years to a four-year term beginning on the following January 1. Two are elected in the year after the presidential election and one is elected in the year before it. There is also an elected township fiscal officer, who serves a four-year term beginning on April 1 of the year after the election, which is held in November of the year before the presidential election. Vacancies in the fiscal officership or on the board of trustees are filled by the remaining trustees.

References

External links
Vinton County Chamber of Commerce 

Townships in Vinton County, Ohio
Townships in Ohio